The peace lines or peace walls are a series of separation barriers in Northern Ireland that separate predominantly Irish republican and nationalist Catholic neighbourhoods from predominantly British loyalist and unionist Protestant neighbourhoods. They have been built at urban interface areas in Belfast and elsewhere.

The majority of peace walls are located in Belfast, but they also exist in other regions with more than 20 miles of walls in Northern Ireland.

History
Although temporary peace walls were built in Belfast in the 1920s (in Ballymacarett) and 1930s (in Sailortown),  the first peace lines of "the Troubles" era were built in 1969, following the outbreak of civil unrest and the 1969 Northern Ireland riots. They were initially built as temporary structures, but due to their effective nature they have become wider, longer, more numerous and more permanent. They have been increased in both height and number since the Good Friday Agreement of 1998. Three-quarters of Belfast's estimated 97 peace lines and related structures (such as gates and closed roads) are in the north and west of the city. These are also the poorer and more disadvantaged areas of Belfast. 67% of deaths during the sectarian violence occurred within  of one of these "interface structures".

The stated purpose of the peace lines is to minimise inter-communal violence between Catholics (most of whom are nationalists who self-identify as Irish) and Protestants (most of whom are unionists who self-identify as British).

Some have gates in them (sometimes staffed by police) that allow passage during daylight but are closed at night.

In recent years, they have even become locations for tourism. Black taxis now take groups of tourists around Belfast's peace lines, trouble spots and famous murals.

The most prominent peace lines in the past few years separate the nationalist Falls Road and unionist Shankill Road areas of West Belfast; the nationalist Short Strand from the unionist Cluan Place areas of East Belfast, the unionist Corcrain Road and the nationalist Orbins Drive in Portadown and the unionist Fountain Estate and nationalist Bishop Street area of Derry.

In 2008, a public discussion began about how and when the peace lines could be removed. Belfast City Council agreed to develop a strategy regarding the removal of peace walls on 1 September 2011. At the end of 2011, several local community initiatives resulted in the opening of a number of interface structures for a trial period. A study was released in 2012 indicating that 69% of residents believe that the peace walls are still necessary because of potential violence.

In January 2012, the International Fund for Ireland launched a Peace Walls funding programme to support local communities who want to work towards beginning to remove the peace walls. In May 2013, the Northern Ireland Executive committed to the removal of all peace lines by mutual consent by 2023.

In 2017, the Belfast Interface Project published a study entitled "Interface Barriers, Peacelines & Defensive Architecture" that identified 97 separate walls, barriers and interfaces in Belfast. A history of the development of these structures can be found at the Peacewall Archive.

In September 2017, the Northern Ireland Department of Justice published its Interface Programme, established to deliver the commitment made by the Northern Ireland Executive to remove all Interface structures by 2023 under the Together: Building a United Community Strategy.

In September 2019, a series of events were held in Belfast to mark the anniversary of 50 years of peace lines in the city. This included an international conference alongside other events to discuss the past and possible future of the peace lines.

See also 
 Defensive wall
 Interface area
 Segregation in Northern Ireland

References

Further reading
 James O’Leary (28 October 2022) Belfast’s ‘peace walls’: How the politics and policy of 1969-1971 shaped the city’s contemporary ‘interface areas.’ Chapter 13 (pp 203-219) in The Routledge Handbook of Architecture, Urban Space and Politics, Vol I, (ISBN 9781003112464) DOI. Edited by Bobic and Haghighi, Routledge (Taylor & Francis Group, New York).
 Belfast Interface Project (2 June 2017). Interface Barriers, Peacelines and Defensive Architecture, Belfast 2017. Retrieved 30 September 2017

External links 
 Peacewall Archive (An archive of photos, maps, texts and links relating to Belfast's Peacelines)
 Belfast Interface Project Interfaces Map (An interactive map locating all Interface barriers in Northern Ireland, surveyed in 2017)
 NI Department of Justice Interface Programme (established to deliver the commitment made by the Northern Ireland Executive to remove all Interface structures by 2023)
 Peace Lines
 Ethnic Interface in North Belfast
 Forty years of peace lines (BBC News web page detailing the various peace lines across Northern Ireland as of mid-2009)

Walls
Politics of Belfast
Geography of Belfast
The Troubles (Northern Ireland)
Separation barriers
Walls in Northern Ireland
20th century in Belfast
21st century in Belfast